Pascal Zavaro (born 3 October 1959) is a French composer.

Life 
Zavaro studied at the Conservatoire de Paris.

In his music, rhythmic thinking is predominant. The sources are very broad, from rock, Bartók, Stravinsky or some scores of Steve Reich, resulting in a very personal and innovative expression.

Main works 
 Stratus, for large orchestra,
 Flashes, for large orchestra,
 The Meeting, for large orchestra,
 Alia, for orchestra,
 Concerto, for cello and orchestra,
 Silicon Music, concerto for electric violin and ensemble,
 Tag, for string quartet,
 Remiix, for string quartet,
 La Grève, for clarinet, bass clarinet, percussion, piano and string quintet (music for the eponymous film by Sergei Eisenstein),
 Trois Danses en sextuor, for clarinet, piano and string quartet,
 Three Studies for a Crucufixion, for orchestra,
 Densha Otoko, for piano trio,

External links 
 Pascal Zavaro's website
 Pascal Zavaro on France Musique
 Pascal Zavaro, interview on tutti-magazine
 Pascal Zavaro on APOSTROPH'
 Pascal Zavaro on Gérad Billaudot Éditeur
 Khatia Buniatishvili plays Pascal Zavaro (YouTube)

1959 births
Living people
Conservatoire de Paris alumni
20th-century French composers
21st-century French composers
French male composers
French percussionists
French male musicians
20th-century French male musicians
21st-century French male musicians